Leo Johnson may refer to:

Leo Johnson (Brookside), a character from the British television series Brookside
Leo Johnson (Twin Peaks), a character from the American television series Twin Peaks
Leo Johnson (curler) (1901–1976), Canadian curler
The Family Research Council employee who prevented a mass murder in 2012.